Shaw is an unincorporated community in the Two-Mile Prairie of Boone County, Missouri, United States, northeast of Columbia. It is located at  (38.9736517, -92.2032379).

History 
A post office called Shaw was established in 1894, and remained in operation until 1907. The community has the name of S. M. Shaw, a local landowner.

References 

Unincorporated communities in Boone County, Missouri
Unincorporated communities in Missouri